William, Willie, or Bill Nixon may refer to:

 William Nixon (minister) (1803-1900), Moderator of the General Assembly of the Free Church of Scotland
 William M. Nixon (1814–1893), English Australian gunmaker
 William Penn Nixon (1832–1912), American publisher
 William Nixon (architect) (1859-1931), Australian architect in New South Wales
 William Glennie Nixon (1881–?), Canadian farmer
 Bill Nixon (William John Nixon, 1886–1916), English footballer
 Willie Nixon (1916–?), American baseball player